Schisandra rubriflora (红花五味子), the Chinese magnolia vine, is a species of flowering plant in the family Schisandraceae that is native to China (West Sichuan and North Yunnan), India and Myanmar. Waxy red, cup-shaped pendulous blooms in summer are followed by red berries.

The Latin specific epithet rubriflora means red-flowered.

This plant is grown as an ornamental garden subject. It has gained the Royal Horticultural Society’s Award of Garden Merit.

References

External links
 
 
 

rubriflora
Flora of China
Flora of East Himalaya
Flora of Myanmar